Hollimon, meaning Holy-Man, is a surname. Notable people with the surname include:

Greg Hollimon (born 1956), American actor
Joe Hollimon (born 1952), American football player
LeBaron Hollimon (born 1969), American soccer player and coach
Mike Hollimon (born 1982), American baseball player